Yugoslavia competed at the 1963 Mediterranean Games held in Naples, Italy.

Medalists

External links
Yugoslavia at the 1963 Mediterranean Games at the Olympic Museum Belgrade website
1963 Official Report at the International Mediterranean Games Committee

Nations at the 1963 Mediterranean Games
1963
Mediterranean Games